Matthew Michael McLain (born August 6, 1999) is an American professional baseball shortstop in the Cincinnati Reds organization. He played college baseball for the UCLA Bruins. McLain was selected by the Reds with the 17th overall pick in the 2021 Major League Baseball draft.

Amateur career
McLain attended Arnold O. Beckman High School in Irvine, California. He committed to attend the University of California, Los Angeles (UCLA), to play college baseball for the UCLA Bruins. As a high school senior, he batted .369 with three home runs. He was selected by the Arizona Diamondbacks in the first round with the 25th overall selection of the 2018 Major League Baseball draft. However, he did not sign, and instead chose to enroll at UCLA.

During the summer of 2018, McLain played in the West Coast League for the Bellingham Bells, and was awarded the Top Prospect Award. As a freshman at UCLA in 2019, he appeared in 61 games (with sixty being starts) in which he slashed .203/.276/.355 with four home runs and thirty RBIs. That summer, he played collegiate summer baseball with the Wareham Gatemen of the Cape Cod Baseball League, and was West division MVP of the league's all-star game. In 2020, McLain played in 13 games and batted .397 with four home runs before the season was cancelled due to the COVID-19 pandemic. In 2021, he missed three weeks due to a fractured thumb, but still hit .333 with nine home runs and 36 RBIs in 47 games.

Professional career
McLain was selected by the Cincinnati Reds with the 17th overall pick in the 2021 Major League Baseball draft. McLain signed with the Reds on July 26, 2021.

McLain made his professional debut with the Rookie-level Arizona Complex League Reds and was promoted to the Dayton Dragons of the High-A Central. Over 31 games between the two teams, he slashed .283/.389/.462 with three home runs, 19 RBIs, and ten stolen bases.
For the 2022 season, he was promoted to Reds Double A affiliate Chattanooga Lookouts.

Personal life
McLain's brothers, Nick and Sean, also play baseball.

References

External links

UCLA Bruins bio

1999 births
Living people
Baseball shortstops
UCLA Bruins baseball players
Wareham Gatemen players
Arizona Complex League Reds players
Dayton Dragons players
Chattanooga Lookouts players